Pahora is a genus of Polynesian araneomorph spiders in the family Physoglenidae that was first described by Raymond Robert Forster in 1990. Originally placed with the Synotaxidae, it was moved to the Physoglenidae in 2017.

Species
 it contains nine species, all found on New Zealand:
Pahora cantuaria Forster, 1990 – New Zealand
Pahora graminicola Forster, 1990 – New Zealand
Pahora kaituna Forster, 1990 – New Zealand
Pahora media Forster, 1990 – New Zealand
Pahora montana Forster, 1990 – New Zealand
Pahora murihiku Forster, 1990 (type) – New Zealand
Pahora rakiura Forster, 1990 – New Zealand
Pahora taranaki Forster, 1990 – New Zealand
Pahora wiltoni Forster, 1990 – New Zealand

See also
 List of Physoglenidae species

References

Araneomorphae genera
Physoglenidae
Spiders of New Zealand
Taxa named by Raymond Robert Forster